DOI or Doi may refer to:

Science and technology
 Digital object identifier, an international standard for document identification
 Distinctness of image, a quantification of vision used in optics
 2,5-Dimethoxy-4-iodoamphetamine, a hallucinogenic drug

Organizations
 Department of Information (Australia), Australian government department, 1939–1950
 Division of Investigation, a precursor to the U.S. Federal Bureau of Investigation
 New York City Department of Investigation, law enforcement agency
 United States Department of the Interior, an executive department of the U.S. government

Other uses
 Doi (surname), a Japanese surname
 Doi (retailer), a Japanese company
 Dogri language (ISO 639 code), spoken in India and Pakistan

See also